Romain Arneodo and Hugo Nys were the reigning champions from when the tournament was last held in 2019, but chose to play in Gstaad instead.

Hans Hach Verdugo and John Isner won the title, defeating Hunter Reese and Sem Verbeek in the final, 5–7, 6–2, [10–4].

Seeds

Draw

Draw

References

External Links
 Main Draw

Los Cabos Open - Doubles